Andrew Surmani is president and CEO of Surmani Business Coaching and associate professor of music industry studies/academic lead of the Master of Arts in Music Industry Administration program in the Mike Curb College of Arts, Media and Communication at  California State University, Northridge (CSUN). Previously, he served as chief marketing officer for Alfred Music, where he played a key role in the company's acquisition of Warner Brothers Publications, and launched numerous product lines.

Education 
Surmani has a Bachelor of Music degree in trumpet performance, and a Master of Business Administration degree from California State University, Northridge. While at CSUN, he played with the CSUN Wind Ensemble, Orchestra and Jazz "A" Band.

Publications 
Surmani has co-authored numerous books including the Alfred's Essentials of Music Theory series and Copyright Handbook for Music Educators and Directors. Alfred's Essentials of Music Theory is a multi-part multimedia program that teaches beginner and intermediate level music theory in individual and classroom settings. Surmani was also instrumental in the launch of Alfred Music's Sound Innovations series, the world's first customizable method for band and orchestra.

Performances 
As a musician, Surmani plays the trumpet and has toured throughout the US, Europe and Japan, and has performed in the Montreux Jazz Festival (Switzerland), Istanbul International Jazz Festival (Turkey), Jazz à Juan (Juan les Pins, France), Jazz à Vienne (Vienne, France), Umbria Jazz Festival (Italy), Wigan (England) and the Lake Biwa (Japan) jazz festivals. He has also performed in the concert halls of Carnegie Hall, David Geffen Hall and Alice Tully Hall at Lincoln Center for the Performing Arts, Fumon Hall in Tokyo, and the Dorothy Chandler Pavilion in Los Angeles.

He played lead trumpet in the Walt Disney World All-American College Jazz Band and in the California All-State Honor Band, the McDonald's All-American High School Marching Band and Jazz Band.

Nonprofits 
He was a founding board member and is a past president of the international education nonprofit Jazz Education Network (JEN).

Surmani also served on the Music and Arts Technology Industry Advisory Board at Indiana University - Purdue University Indianapolis (IUPUI) and the Technology In Music Education (TI:ME) Advisory Board. He was the founder and past president of the MATES Foundation, a 501(c)(3) non-profit corporation formed to support a new arts and technology charter school in Thousand Oaks, California.

Surmani is a native of Oakland, California, and now resides in Los Angeles, California.

References

External links
 Surmani Business Coaching
 Artist Access
California State University, Northridge Profile
 CSUN Master of Arts in Music Industry Administration Degree Program
 Artist House video on Alfred Music
 Artist House video on Music Education
 SB&O April 2012 Music Publishing Article Featuring Andrew Surmani
 Andrew Surmani on LinkedIn
 Surmani Business Coaching on LinkedIn
 Andrew Surmani on Twitter
 Surmani Business Coaching on Twitter
Andrew Surmani on Instagram
 Surmani Business Coaching on Instagram
 The Changing Face of Wholesale in MMR Magazine, August 2013
 Links to publications at Alfred Music
 The Music Products Industry as Part of a Collegiate Music Industry Program’s Curriculum
 Andrew Surmani's Website
 Music Connection Magazine Article on Music Industry Studies at CSUN
 In Tune Magazine Article on Music Travel, "Music Travel in the Time of (and After) COVID," Vol. 19, No. 2
 In Tune Magazine Article on Music Travel, "On the Road Again," Vol. 20, No. 2

American music industry executives
Living people
Year of birth missing (living people)
California State University, Northridge alumni
American trumpeters